Tess of the D'Urbervilles is a 4-hour BBC television adaptation of Thomas Hardy's 1891 book of the same name. The script is by David Nicholls. It tells the story of Tess Durbeyfield, a low-born country girl whose family find they have noble connections.

The series commenced in the United Kingdom on 14 September 2008 and ran until 5 October 2008 airing in four parts on BBC One. In the United States, it aired as part of PBS's Masterpiece Classic in two parts from 4 January until 11 January 2009. In Australia, ABC1 also opted to air this series as a two-part special each Sunday at 8:30pm from 11 April until 18 April 2010.

The cast features Gemma Arterton as Tess, Hans Matheson as Alec, Eddie Redmayne as Angel, Ruth Jones as Joan, Anna Massey as Mrs d'Urberville and Kenneth Cranham as Rev Clare.

Plot summary

Production

Writing
David Nicholls first read Hardy's famous novel at the age of 16, but on reapproaching the story over 25 years later he says "it seemed to cry out for a new screen adaptation". He described it as "a wonderfully emotionally-charged story, both intensely romantic and startlingly violent". In adapting the novel for the screen Nicholls gave particular focus to the character of Tess as "an active, forceful, opinionated young working-class woman" and not merely a "passive victim". He was also "keen to emphasise that this is very much a novel about young people in love".

On completion of the project Nicholls said he was "delighted" with how it turned out, hoping audiences would find it "faithfully captures the light and shade of Hardy's masterpiece".

Filming

Nicholls worked closely with director David Blair to ensure the visual style of the series complemented his faithful adaptation of the story. The episodes were largely filmed in Gloucestershire and Wiltshire and shot on high quality 35mm film rather than on digital video for a richer and more romantic appearance. Nicholls observed that "any adaptation of Hardy has to capture the beauty of his nature writing without forgetting that this is a brutal, unforgiving landscape", and that "the production should be beautiful but not 'pretty'; it should be about characters in a landscape, not just the landscape."

The series made extensive use of location shooting. Filming took place in many parts of southern England, including Thomas Hardy's native Dorset. Nicholls recalled how he found "Tess and Angel's farewell in the morning light at Stonehenge... the most moving scene in English literature, so to be able to recreate it, at dawn, on location at the correct time of year, has been tremendously exciting."

Cast and characters

Primary characters
Gemma Arterton as Tess Durbeyfield - Tess is the innocent but spirited protagonist of the story and the eldest daughter of a poor, rural Victorian family. She is sensitive, loyal and kind and tries to do the best for her loved ones. A "fine and handsome girl", Tess easily attracts the attention of admirers but her life is undone by their misdeeds and misjudgements.

Arterton said, "I was attracted to the role because stripped down, it's such a basic story about love and missed opportunities, everyone can relate to it. It's also just brilliant, brilliant storytelling."
She perceives Tess as "a straightforward country girl, very pretty, but unaware of her beauty. Although people chip away at her life, she grows stronger, which is the incredible thing about her."

Hans Matheson as Alec D'Urbeville - Alec is the self-centered and manipulative eldest son of Tess' supposed illustrious relatives, the D'Urbervilles. After going to work at The Slopes — Alec's family home — Tess falls into his clutches. He is the "tragic mischief" and she is easily seduced by his apparent charm and generosity.

Matheson observed that "Although Alec's actions are extreme, they're unconscious. So you have to understand him as a human being, as well as a villain." He also found the story "about the countryside... [about] spring and the seasons and the descriptions of love" and found it surprising how few cinematic versions there were of the tale, because "the novel is so filmic."

Eddie Redmayne as Angel Clare - Angel is an intelligent and kind clergyman's son. Tess first sees him at a Mayday dance but he ignores her. Choosing to follow a life in farming rather than one in the Church, he wants to work for the "honour and glory of man". Tess meets him again at a farm where she's working as a milkmaid and they fall deeply in love.

Redmayne heaped praise on the novel and the character of Tess, acknowledging that "Hardy had the boldness to create a character with great strength at that time, which I think is what makes her so enduring and relevant today".

Ruth Jones as Joan Durbeyfield
Ian Puleston-Davies as John Durbeyfield
Jodie Whittaker as Izz Huett
Donald Sumpter as Parson Tringham
Anna Massey as Mrs D'Urbeville
Christopher Fairbank as Groby
Jo Woodcock as Liza-Lu Durbeyfield

Secondary characters
Joel Rowbottom as Abraham Durbeyfield
Steven Robertson as Cuthbert Clare
Hugh Skinner as Felix Clare
Laura Elphinstone as Car Darch
Sara Lloyd Gregory as Nancy Darch
Christine Bottomley as Kate
Emma Stansfield as Mary
Merelina Kendall as Miss Evans
Sarah Counsell as Drunken woman
Ellie Darcey-Alden as Modesty
 Julie Barclay as Mrs Baxter 
 Cellan Geraint David as "Baby Sorrow "

Episodes

Reception
Reaction to the serial was mixed, generating mainly warm but unenthusiastic reviews. Most critics were impressed with the acting, especially of Gemma Arterton's portrayal of the titular character, but found the series period details to be anachronistic for the era.

Euan Ferguson of The Guardian praised the first and second episodes as "wonderful", and that while it lacked the "bubbling, spirited humour of Cranford" it was "less insipid than so much Austen". He also acclaimed Arterton as "terribly subtle" in the leading role.

Hermione Eyre of The Independent called it a "commendably faithful adaptation" and praised Arterton's performance in the titular role, asserting that the actress "brims with life and spirit". Eyre did acknowledge, however, that the version lacked the "power" of Roman Polanski's 1979 version.

Robert Hanks, also of The Independent, noted that the series "looks lovely" but perhaps "a bit too lovely". While noting Gemma Arterton as "gorgeous" he found the acting "mostly fair to middling" with the exception of Anna Massey, whom he called "quite brilliant" in the role of Mrs D'Urberville. Hanks also bemoaned the lack of realism, noting that too many costume dramas today "can’t afford to remind the viewer too explicitly just how grubby and laborious life was in the days before indoor hot running water, automatic washing machines and biological powder".

In a review for the Thomas Hardy Society, Roger Webster praised many elements of the series; the casting, screenplay, and visual qualities of the production, and concluding his essay "it certainly has a great deal to offer as both literary adaptation and television drama.".

In the US Mary McNamara of the Los Angeles Times found Blair was able to make "full and gorgeous use of Hardy's depiction of Tess as Earth Goddess" and praised the "visceral visual beauty" elicited from the landscape. She also found Arterton "a marvelous Tess" which she saw as important "considering the film pretty much lives or dies with her performance".

Brian Lowry of Variety also acclaimed Arterton's performance; calling her "wide-eyed and lovely" he praised how she "conveys the pitiful plight of her simple character trapped in an unforgiving society". He was, however, critical of the pacing, saying that the series soon becomes an "arduous trek". Still he found that "the payoff is strong enough to justify all that hiking across lush countryside".

David Wiegand of the San Francisco Chronicle was less than impressed. He found David Blair's direction "competent" but also criticised the show's regard for period authenticity, finding that "the impoverished Durbeyfields and other villagers look a bit too well scrubbed and freshly laundered and that Wessex itself is a bit too pretty". Nevertheless, he remarked that Gemma Arterton was "excellent" and that the serial would "do as a reminder of Hardy's timeless appeal until something better comes along".

Several viewers, while enjoying the series overall, noted that the hymn 'How Great Thou Art' was anachronistic. Some were disturbed enough to complain to the BBC.

References

External links
 
 

2000s British drama television series
2008 British television series debuts
2008 British television series endings
BBC television dramas
2000s British television miniseries
Television series set in the 1870s
Works by David Nicholls
Television shows based on British novels
Films based on Tess of the d'Urbervilles
Films directed by David Blair (director)
Television shows based on works by Thomas Hardy